Jackson County Airport  is a county-owned, public-use airport located three nautical miles (6 km) northeast of the central business district of Edna, in Jackson County, Texas, United States.

Facilities and aircraft 
It has one runway designated 15/33 with an asphalt surface measuring 3,393 by 70 feet (1,034 x 21 m).

For the 12-month period ending May 26, 2008, the airport had 7,620 aircraft operations, an average of 20 per day: 98% general aviation and 2% military. At that time there were 22 aircraft based at this airport: 95.5% single-engine and 4.5% multi-engine.

References

External links 
 Aerial photo as of 20 February 1995 from USGS The National Map
 

Airports in Texas
Buildings and structures in Jackson County, Texas
Transportation in Jackson County, Texas